The men's 110 metres hurdles at the 2012 European Athletics Championships was held at the Helsinki Olympic Stadium on 30 June and 1 July.

Medalists

Records

Schedule

Results

Round 1
First 4 in each heat (Q) and 4 best performers (q) advance to the Semifinals.

Wind:Heat 1: -1.2 m/s, Heat 2: +0.5 m/s, Heat 3: -0.7 m/s, Heat 4: -2.0 m/s, Heat 5: +1.1 m/s

Semifinals
First 2 in each heat (Q) and 2 best performers (q) advance to the Semifinals.

Wind:Heat 1: 0.0 m/s, Heat 2: -1.1 m/s, Heat 3: -0.3 m/s

Final
Wind: +0.5 m/s

References

Round 1 Results
Semifinal Results
Final Results

Hurdles 110
Sprint hurdles at the European Athletics Championships